Maurice Wignall (born 17 April 1976) is a Jamaican hurdling athlete.

His first appearance in a major international championship was at the 1997 World Championships, where he competed in the long jump competition. He jumped 8.09, which still stands as his personal best.

Wignall's success in hurdling came relatively late. He took his first medal, a bronze medal, at the 2002 Commonwealth Games. At the 2004 World Indoor Championships, Wignall won the bronze medal in 60 m hurdles which is the distance used indoor. Later that year he competed in the Olympic 110 metres Hurdles where he placed fourth in the final, missing the bronze medal by one hundredth of a second. In the semi final he set a new national record with a time of 13.17.

At the end of the 2004 season Wignall won the silver medal in the 2nd IAAF World Athletics Final. He also competed in Helsinki 2005, but finished seventh in the final.

In March 2006 he won the gold medal at the Commonwealth Games, with a time of 13.26, comfortably ahead of the rest of the field.

References 
 
 2006 Commonwealth Games Athlete Profile

1976 births
Living people
Jamaican male hurdlers
Athletes (track and field) at the 1999 Pan American Games
Athletes (track and field) at the 2002 Commonwealth Games
Athletes (track and field) at the 2004 Summer Olympics
Athletes (track and field) at the 2006 Commonwealth Games
Athletes (track and field) at the 2008 Summer Olympics
Commonwealth Games gold medallists for Jamaica
Commonwealth Games bronze medallists for Jamaica
Olympic athletes of Jamaica
Commonwealth Games medallists in athletics
Goodwill Games medalists in athletics
Competitors at the 2001 Goodwill Games
Pan American Games competitors for Jamaica
Medallists at the 2002 Commonwealth Games
Medallists at the 2006 Commonwealth Games